Rothbury may refer to:

Places
Australia
 Rothbury, New South Wales, a small town in the City of Cessnock

England
 Rothbury, a town and civil parish in the County of Northumberland

United States
 Rothbury, Michigan, a village in Oceana County

Other uses
 Rothbury Festival, a four-day music festival held in 2008 and 2009 in Rothbury, Michigan
 Rothbury Riot, an incident that occurred in 1929 at Rothbury, New South Wales
 Rothbury Terrier, a breed of dog also known as the Bedlington Terrier
 For the Rothbury Hotel in Brisbane, Australia, see Shell House, Brisbane